Lahore Se Aagey is a 2016 Pakistani road-comedy romantic film directed by Wajahat Rauf, written by Yasir Hussain and Produced by Wajahat Rauf, Asfand Faruok, Salman Iqbal, and Jarjees Seja. The film is a spin-off to 2015 comedy film Karachi Se Lahore and second installment in Karachi Lahore film series. It features an all star cast, including Hussain (who was also part of the original film) along with Saba Qamar, Behroze Sabzwari, Abdullah Farhatullah, Mubashir Malik, Atiqa Odho, Rubina Ashraf and Noor ul Hasan. The film was released worldwide on 11 November 2016 under the production banner of Showcase Films. Upon release, it received criticism from critics and became a moderate box office success.

Plot
Moti from the original film continues his journey from Lahore to Swat where he meets a female rock star Taraa Ahmed.

Cast
 Yasir Hussain as Mutazalzal a.k.a. Moti
 Saba Qamar as Taraa Ahmed
 Rubina Ashraf as Nusrat (Mumani)
 Behroze Sabzwari as M.Mughal (Mamu)
 Aashir Wajahat as Zeezo
 Abdullah Farhatullah as Boss
 Noor ul Hassan as Balla
 Omer Sultan as AB
 Atiqa Odho as Shama Rani
 Yasir Taj as Baba
 Frieha Altaf as herself
 Asad Siddiqui as a Pan seller (cameo appearance)
 Ali Zafar as himself (special appearance)
 Shiraz Uppal as Judge (special appearance)
 Komal Rizvi as Judge (special appearance)
 Goher Mumtaz as Judge (special appearance)
 Iftikhar Thakur as a hair dresser (special appearance)

Production
According to the director Wajahat Rauf, after the release of Karachi Se Lahore, Yasir Hussain received public recognition and became popular for his role of "Moti" so he decided to make its sequel. Rauf said: "Following the release of Karachi Se Lahore, Moti became a tremendous hit amongst the audiences, so Yasir and I decided to make a separate film starring just him."
The film is written by Yasir Hussain and he will play the lead role with Saba Qamar. Yasir Hussain has told in an interview that the cast from Karachi Se Lahore will also make cameo appearances. The film is shot in Karachi, Lahore and the northern parts of Pakistan. The cast also includes Rubina Ashraf and Behroze Sabzwari in pivotal roles where as Saba Qamar played the role of an upcoming rockstar. First look of the film was revealed on 20 February 2016.

Soundtrack
The first song of the film "Kalabaaz Dil" was released on 24 September 2016 by ARY Films. Second song of the film "Zara Si Laga Lo" was released on 15 October 2016. Full album was released on 24 October 2016.

Release 
A teaser for the film was released online on 8 August 2016. An official trailer for the film was released online on 9 September 2016. The film was first premiered in Lahore, and then in Karachi on 9 and 10 November 2016 respectively. It then released on 11 November nationwide.

Box office
The film collected up to  worldwide and became the fourth highest-grossing film of 2016.

Critical reception
Sarah Raza Ansari of Samaa TV rated 5/10 and said, "The whole story wraps off in this way on a good note." She added, "The plot could have been improved with a little effort."
Asfia Afzal of Business Recorder also said for the improvement of plot.

Rafay Mahmood of The Express Tribune said, "The film itself is nothing more than an extended chase sequence. The shots are neat and well-framed but aren't grand enough to explore the natural beauty, a cardinal sin when treating any road movie."
Gibran Khalil of DAWN said, "Instead of embodying the spirit of a road trip film by evoking a smooth sense of movement, Lahore Se Aagey feels more like a collection of short sketches. I'll admit that it looks like the LSA team had a ball making the movie."
Both critics rated the film 2/5. 

Shubham Bahukhandi of Dekh News rated 3.5/5 and praised its direction, while said that it has the worst screenplay ever and its music is not even average.

Hamza Shafique of Dubai Desi Reviews gave 1.5 out of 5 Desi stars and commented, "Lahore Se Aagay for me is more like a standup comedy act which one might enjoy but not expect from a silver screen entertainer."

Accolades

Sequel

After the success of first two films, director Wajahat Rauf announced that a third film titled, Karachi Se Lahore 3 will release on Eid al-Fitr 2019. Shooting would begin in December 2018.

See also
Karachi Lahore (film series)
List of Pakistani films
List of Pakistani films of 2016

References

External links

2010s Urdu-language films
2016 films
2010s road movies
Pakistani romantic comedy films
Films directed by Wajahat Rauf
Films scored by Shiraz Uppal
Yasir Hussain
Films shot in Gilgit-Baltistan
Pakistani road comedy-drama films